This article describes the party affiliations of the leaders of each member-state represented in the European Council during the year 2002. The list below gives the political party that each head of government, or head of state, belonged to at the national level, as well as the European political alliance to which that national party belonged. The states are listed from most to least populous. More populous states have greater influence in the council, in accordance with the system of Qualified Majority Voting.

During the period in question there were changes of the governing party in Portugal and the Netherlands, with PES parties in both getting replaced by EPP parties.  This prompted a reversal of which party held a plurality of seats on the council; the EPP maintained that plurality until 11 January 2007, when the government change in Austria returned the plurality to PES.

Summary

List of leaders (1 January 2002)

Changes

Affiliation

 – The AEN is founded, with its membership including Ireland's Fianna Fáil, which held office under Bertie Ahern.

National party changes
On 17 November, the governing French RPR merged with other right-wing parties to form the UMP.  The successor party continued the RPR's EPP membership.

See also
Presidency of the Council of the European Union

External links
Council of the European Union (official website)

Lists of parties in the European Council